National Lawyers' Congress (NLC) is the body representing the lawyers practising before the various courts of India on behalf of Democratic Indira Congress (Karunakaran) (DIC).

History
National Lawyers’ Congress (NLC) was formed as a front organisation of DIC(K). Its first State convention was held in Cochin on 28 May 2005.

NLC organized special reception for the Nava Kerala Yatra under the leadership of the DIC(K) president Sri. K. Muraleedharan on 20 December 2005 at Jos Junction and garlanded the President with currency worth Rs. 41500/- as a special contribution for the DIC(K) building fund for Priyadarsini Bhavan.

The function was attended by a large number of lawyers from Kerala High Court, Ernakulam District Court, North ParavurAdditional District Court and the courts in Aluva, Perumbavoor, Kochi, Muvattupuzha, Kolencheri and Kothamangalam along with lawyers' groups in Family Court, MACT, Tax, CBI, CAT, Consumer, Ombudsman, Human Rights etc.

External links
national-lawyers-congress.org

Legal organisations based in India